Hideki Kase (born 1 December 1959) is a Japanese professional golfer.

Career
Kase played on the Japan Golf Tour, winning four times. He also played on the PGA Tour in 1997 where his best finish was 15th at the Sprint International.

Professional wins (20)

Japan Golf Tour wins (4)

Japan Golf Tour playoff record (0–2)

Other wins (8)
1983 Mizuno Pro Rookies Tournament
1985 Wakayama Open
1989 Masaaki Hirao Pro-Am
1990 Sanko Grand Summer Championship, Masaaki Hirao Pro-Am, KSD Pro-Am
1995 Mitsubishi Oil Cup Masaaki Hirao Pro-Am
2014 Hokkaido Open

Japan Senior Golf Tour wins (3)
2010 Japan PGA Senior Championship
2014 ISPS Handa Cup Philanthropy Senior Tournament
2017 Sevenhills Cup KBC Senior Open

Other senior wins (5)
2010 Asahi Midoriken Cup 12th TVQ Senior Open Golf
2016 Northern Kanto Senior Open, Asahi Midoriken Cup TVQ Senior Open
2019 UNITEX Pro-Am, Uniden Grand Senior Championship

Team appearances
Four Tours World Championship (representing Japan): 1990, 1991
Dunhill Cup (representing Japan): 1995
Dynasty Cup (representing Japan): 2005

See also
1996 PGA Tour Qualifying School graduates

References

External links

Japanese male golfers
Japan Golf Tour golfers
PGA Tour golfers
Sportspeople from Chiba Prefecture
1959 births
Living people